The 2009 Burgos bombing occurred on 29 July 2009, when at least 65 people were injured after a van bomb carrying more than 300 kg of explosive went off outside a Civil Guard barracks in the northern city of Burgos, Spain. The attack was  blamed on Basque separatist group Euskadi Ta Askatasuna (ETA). Several children were among the 65 wounded in the attack.

Some days before the attack, Spanish police warned that the organization might be trying a series of van bomb attacks after they found information of three vans being carried to Spain in a document seized from arrested members Asier Borrero, Itziar Plaza and Iurgi Garitagoitia a few weeks before the attack.

Occurrence
About 120 people, one-third of them children, were sleeping in the building when the bomb went off at around 4:00 am local time (0200 UTC), blowing off most of its facade. The blast also left a two-metre (six-foot) deep crater in the street outside the barracks and heavily damaged the 14 storey residential complex and other buildings in the area.

Aftermath
The day after the bombing, a car bomb explosion on the island of Majorca killed two civil guards, Carlos Sáenz de Tejada García, 28, and Diego Salva Lezaun, 26. The two attacks came few hours before the 50th anniversary of the foundation of the organization.

References

External links 

2009 crimes in Spain
Car and truck bombings in Spain
Terrorist incidents in Spain
ETA (separatist group) actions
Terrorist incidents in Spain in 2009
Building bombings in Spain